The Nassau Herald is a weekly newspaper serving the Five Towns communities of Nassau County – Lawrence, Woodmere, Hewlett, Cedarhurst, Inwood and Atlantic Beach. It is part of the Long Island Herald newspaper chain, which includes The Jewish Star and the Oyster Bay Guardian, is owned by Richner Communications, and covers Nassau County, New York.

The paper started publishing in 1924 and was based out of Lawrence, New York. After the offices were destroyed by a fire in 2004, the newspaper moved into offices in Garden City, New York with the other Long Island Herald newspapers.

Published every Thursday with a daily online presence, The Herald is sold for $1.00 at newsstands. The Herald newspapers are members of the New York Press Association.

References

External links
 Nassau Herald
 Long Island Herald newspapers

Five Towns
Newspapers published in New York (state)
Weekly newspapers published in the United States
Newspapers established in 1924
1924 establishments in New York (state)